Westgate Under Fire is the third studio album by Welsh ragga metal band Dub War, released on 5 August 2022 via Earache Records. It is the first album of new material by the band since Wrong Side of Beautiful in 1996.

Background
After their split in 1999, 3/4 of the band went on to form Skindred, however only frontman Benji Webbe remained by 2004. In 2014, the group reunited for a limited number of shows with Mikee Gregory on live drums. This was followed in March 2016 with the single "Fun Done" and "Making a Monster" in October that year. This was initially planned to be part of a series of singles that would eventually culminate in a full album through independent label Saint Ringland Records.

However, these plans eventually fell through until 2022, when the group announced Westgate Under Fire, inspired by the events of the Newport Rising, and important moment in the Chartist movement. The group reunited with Earache Records to release the album, and recruited a host of drummers to perform on the album alongside Gregory. The first single, "Blackkk Man", was released on 2 March 2022. The track was inspired by the murder of George Floyd and subsequent protests. Previous stand-alone single "Fun Done" is included on the album, while "Making a Monster" was renamed "Mary Shelley".

Track listing

Personnel 

Dub War
Benji Webbe – vocals
Jeff Rose – guitars
Richie Glover – bass guitar

Additional musicians
Mikee Gregory – drums
Ranking Roger – vocals on "War Inna Babylon"
Spike T. Smith – drums on "Art of War"
Roy Mayorga – drums on "Reveal It"
Dave Chavarri – drums on "Bite Back"
Jamie Miller – drums on "Crying Clowns"
Mikey Doling – guitar on "Crying Clowns"
Mike Bordin – drums on "Get Back Up"
Tanner Wayne – drums on "Celtic Cross"

Production
Richard "Action" Jackson – production, mixing
Rick Will – mastering
Lord Hagos
Bryan "Chuck" New

Artwork
Artcore – album cover art

Charts

References

2022 albums
Dub War albums
Earache Records albums